Reinhold von Rosen (1605 – 8 December 1667) was a Baltic nobleman fighting for Sweden and France. Reinhold was one of the great generals of the Thirty Years' War.

Birth and origins 
Born in 1605 in Livonia, son of Otto von Rosen and his wife Catharina von Klebeck.

Career 
Reinhold was one of the great generals of the Thirty Years' War. He served Gustavus Adolphus of Sweden in his youth. In 1632, at the Battle of Lützen in which Gustavus Adolphus fell, he commanded a cavalry regiment. He then served Bernard of Saxe-Weimar On 17 July 1635 he successfully defended the Protestant town of Zweibrücken menaced by imperial troops. When Bernard died in 1639, he and the entire Weimar army went into French service and served under Condé and Turenne. He fought under Turenne in his defeat against Mercy at the Battle of Herbsthausen and was taken prisoner.

Marriages 
Rosen married three times. He had a daughter, Marie-Sophie von Rosen (1638–1686), who married Conrad von Rosen.

Death 
Rosen died on 18 December 1667 in the castle he had built in Dettwiller.

References 

1605 births
1667 deaths
French military personnel
French military personnel of the Thirty Years' War
Baltic-German people
People from Bas-Rhin
Swedish military personnel